Uramita is a town and municipality in Antioquia Department, Colombia.

Climate
Uramita has a tropical monsoon climate (Köppen Am) with moderate rainfall from January to March and heavy rainfall in the remaining months.

Municipalities of Antioquia Department